The red-tailed newtonia (Newtonia fanovanae) is a species of bird in the family Vangidae. It is endemic to Madagascar.

Its natural habitat is subtropical or tropical moist lowland forests. It is threatened by habitat loss.

References

External links
BirdLife Species Factsheet.

red-tailed newtonia
red-tailed newtonia
Taxonomy articles created by Polbot
Fauna of the Madagascar lowland forests